Schistocerca camerata is a grasshopper species in the genus Schistocerca.

References

External links 

Acrididae
Insects described in 1899